The Great War is an alternative term for World War I.

It may also refer to:

Historical conflicts
The following terms are all translated from the original language:
"The Great French War", a term sometimes used to collectively refer to the French Revolutionary Wars (1792–1802) and the Napoleonic Wars (1803–15)
The Great Patriotic War, is the Russian name for the Eastern Front of World War II
"The Great War", English translation of Guerra Grande, Paraguayan name for the Paraguayan War
"The Great War", Uruguayan name for the Uruguayan Civil War
"The Great War", Polish and Belarusian name for the Polish–Lithuanian–Teutonic War
The Ten Years' War between Spain and Cuba
The Great Turkish War, also known as "The War of the Holy League"
The Great Northern War, between Russian and Sweden, with assorted other powers on each side
The Great Roman Civil War is a name for Caesar's civil war

Film and television
The Great War (1959 film), a 1959 Italian film
The Great War (2007 film), a 2007 CBC television documentary
The Great War (2017 film), a 2017 American documentary film
The Great War (2019 film), a 2019 American film
The Great War (TV series), a 1964 BBC documentary series
The Great War (YouTube channel), a YouTube channel dedicated to covering the events of World War I and its aftermath
The Great War and the Shaping of the 20th Century, a 4-part 1996 PBS documentary series about World War I

Other
The Great War (novel series), an alternate history trilogy by Harry Turtledove
The Great War (Sabaton album), 2019
The Great War (Justin Currie album), 2010
The Great War: Western Front, a 2023 video game
"The Great War", a song on the extended version of Taylor Swift's album Midnights, 2022
Great War Island, a river island in Serbia, located at the mouth of the Sava River

See also
Guerra Grande (disambiguation)